List of Iran's parliament representatives (9th term) or "List of the representatives of Iran's Islamic Consultative Assembly (9th term)" includes a list which mentions all members of the Majlis of Iran (i.e. Islamic Consultative Assembly) plus the names of the constituencies, provinces, and their political factions. The Legislative elections were held in Islamic Republic of Iran in 2012. The list is as follows:

See also 
 List of Iran's parliament representatives (11th term)
 List of Iran's parliament representatives (10th term)
 List of Iran's parliament representatives (8th term)
 List of Iran's parliament representatives (7th term)
 List of Iran's parliament representatives (6th term)

References 

Islamic Consultative Assembly elections
Islamic Consultative Assembly
Members of the 9th Islamic Consultative Assembly